The Eurovision Song Contest 1997 was the 42nd edition of the annual Eurovision Song Contest, held on 3 May 1997 at the Point Theatre in Dublin, Ireland. The 1997 contest was the seventh edition to be staged in Ireland, as well as the fourth to be produced by RTÉ in five years.

Entries were also permitted for the first time to feature no live music accompaniment, with each performance being able to use only a backing track rather than utilising any part of the orchestra or any live instrumentation from the performers themselves.

The 1997 event would proved to be a watershed for the contest, with many aspects of this event leaving a lasting impact on future editions of Eurovision. These included: the first openly LGBT artist, Iceland's Paul Oscar, selected to compete in the event; changes to contest rules led to the abandonment of live musical accompaniment in future events; a successful trial of televoting in five countries led to widespread adoption for all countries in 1998.

Location 

The selected venue was the Point Theatre, a concert and events venue located amongst the Dublin Docklands which had originally been built as a train depot to serve the nearby port. Opened as a music venue in 1988, it was closed for redevelopment and expansion in 2008 and is now known as the 3Arena. The venue had previously hosted the 1994 and 1995 contests, and with this staging it became the only venue to have hosted three Eurovision Song Contests.

Production 

The Eurovision Song Contest 1997 was produced by the Irish public broadcaster  (RTÉ). Noel Curran served as executive producer, Ian McGarry served as director, Paula Farrell and John Casey served as designers, and Frank McNamara served as musical director, leading the RTÉ Concert Orchestra. Given the financial impact to staging the contest for a fourth time in five years, there was early speculation following Ireland's win in the 1996 contest that RTÉ might stage the event as a co-production with BBC Northern Ireland, however ultimately the Irish broadcaster decided to organise the event on its own once again.

Rehearsals in the contest venue for the competing acts began on 28 April 1997. Each country had two technical rehearsals in the week approaching the contest, with countries rehearsing in the order in which they would perform. The first rehearsals took place on 28 and 29 April, with each country allowed 40 minutes total on stage followed by a 20 minute press conference, followed by the second rehearsals on 30 April and 1 May lasting 30 minutes. Times were also arranged during the week for the artists to be recorded in the RTÉ studios, with footage used during the postcards between each song. Three dress rehearsals were held on 2 and 3 May, with an audience in attendance during the evening dress rehearsal on 2 May. The final dress rehearsal on 3 May was also recorded for use as a production stand-by in case of problems during the live contest.

Television and radio presenter Carrie Crowley and singer Ronan Keating were the presenters of the 1997 contest. The show was opened by good luck messages from past Eurovision winners and hosts to the contestants in the contest, and short interviews with previous contestants also featured preceding some of the postcards between the entries. As lead singer of the Irish boy band Boyzone, Keating also featured as part of the show's interval act, with the group performing the song "Let the Message Run Free". The trophy awarded to the winners was designed by Maura Whelan and Luc Racine, and was presented by the previous year's winning artist Eimear Quinn.

Format

Entries 
Each participating broadcaster submitted one song, which was required to be no longer than three minutes in duration and performed in the language, or one of the languages, of the country which it represented. Short quotations from another language, no more than a single phrase repeated a maximum of three times, were permitted. A maximum of six performers were allowed on stage during each country's performance, and all participants were required to have reached the age of 16 in the year of the contest. Each entry could utilise all or part of the live orchestra and could use instrumental-only backing tracks. This was the first time that a competing song could be accompanied entirely with a backing track following a change to the contest rules, with the previous rules stating that any backing tracks used could only include the sound of instruments featured on stage being mimed by the performers.

Selected entries were not permitted to be released commercially until after 3 February 1997 and after having been selected for the contest. Each country's participating broadcaster was required to have selected their entry by 10 March, and all entries had to be submitted to the contest organisers by 19 March, including the score of the song for use by the orchestra, a sound recording of the entry and backing track for use during the contest, and the text of the song lyrics in its original language and translations in French and English for distribution to the participating broadcasters, their commentators and juries.

Following the confirmation of the twenty-five competing countries, the draw to determine the running order was held on 28 November 1996.

Voting procedure 

The results of the 1997 contest were determined through the same scoring system as had first been introduced in : each country awarded twelve points to its favourite entry, followed by ten points to its second favourite, and then awarded points in decreasing value from eight to one for the remaining songs which featured in the country's top ten, with countries unable to vote for their own entry. The points awarded by the majority of countries were determined by an assembled jury of sixteen individuals, which was required to be split evenly between members of the public and music professionals, comprised additionally of an equal number of men and women, and below and above 30 years of age. Each jury member voted in secret and awarded between one and ten votes to each participating song, excluding that from their own country and with no abstentions permitted. The votes of each member were collected following the country's performance and then tallied by the non-voting jury chairperson to determine the points to be awarded. In any cases where two or more songs in the top ten received the same number of votes, a show of hands by all jury members was used to determine the final placing; if a tie still remained, the youngest jury member would have the deciding vote.

For the first time however, as part of a trial held by the contest organisers, televoting was used to determine the points from five of the participating countries. In these countries viewers had a total of five minutes to register their vote by calling one of twenty-four different telephone numbers to represent the twenty-five competing entries except that which represented their own country. Once the voting phone lines were opened following the performance of the last competing entry, a video recap containing short clips of each competing entry with the accompanying phone number for voting was shown in order to aid viewers during the voting window. In those countries which opted to use televoting to determine their points a jury was still required which would function as a back-up in case technical failure prevented the televote results from being used. The composition of the back-up juries in these countries was identical to the juries in the other countries with regards to profession, gender and age.

Participating countries
Per the rules of the contest twenty-five countries were allowed to participate in the event.

Qualification
Due to the high number of countries wishing to enter the contest a relegation system was introduced in 1993 in order to reduce the number of countries which could compete in each year's contest. Any relegated countries would be able to return the following year, thus allowing all countries the opportunity to compete in at least one in every two editions. The audio-only qualification round used in 1996 had been poorly received among the competing countries, and so a new relegation system was introduced by the European Broadcasting Union for 1997 and future contests. The twenty-five participants in the 1997 contest were made up of the previous year's winning country and host nation Ireland, and the twenty-four countries which had the highest average points total over the preceding four contests. In cases where the average was identical between two or more countries the total number of points scored in the most recent contest determined the final order. Any countries which were not able to compete in the 1997 contest would then be eligible to compete in the 1998 event.

Belgium, Finland,  and Slovakia were therefore excluded from participating in the 1997 contest; however following 's withdrawal due to the date of the final clashing with its Holocaust Remembrance Day Bosnia and Herzegovina was subsequently provided a reprieve and allowed to participate. The calculations used to determine the countries relegated for the 1997 contest are outlined in the table below.

Table key

Conductors
For those countries which opted to utilise the orchestra a separate musical director could be nominated to lead the orchestra during their performance, with the host musical director, Frank McNamara, also available to conduct for those countries which did not nominate their own conductor. The conductors listed below led the orchestra during the performance for the indicated countries; the entries from Austria, Ireland, Germany and Croatia were performed entirely without live orchestration.

 Stavros Lantsias
 Levent Çoker
 Geir Langslet
 Mojmir Sepe
 Pietro Damiani
 Dick Bakker
 Lucio Fabbri
 Toni Xuclà
 Krzesimir Dębski
 Tarmo Leinatamm
 Sinan Alimanović
 
 Curt-Eric Holmquist
 Anacreon Papageorgiou
 Ray Agius
 
 Rutger Gunnarsson
 
 Régis Dupré
 Don Airey
 Szymon Kuran

Participants and results 

The contest took place on 3 May 1997 at 20:00 (IST) and lasted 3 hours and 11 minutes. It featured three representatives who had previously performed as lead artists for the same country.

The winner was the  represented by the song "Love Shine a Light", composed by Kimberley Rew and performed by Katrina and the Waves. Ireland's second place finish earned them their fifth placing in the top two within six years, while Turkey and Cyprus achieved their highest placings yet by finishing third and fifth respectively. Norway meanwhile finished in last place for the eighth time and received their fourth nul points.

The table below outlines the participating countries, the order in which they performed, the competing artists and songs, and the results of the voting:

Detailed voting results 

Jury voting was used to determine the points awarded by most countries, with televoting used in Austria, Germany, Switzerland, Sweden and the United Kingdom. The announcement of the results from each country was conducted in the order in which they performed, with the spokespersons announcing their country's points in English or French in ascending order. The detailed breakdown of the points awarded by each country is listed in the tables below.

12 points
The below table summarises how the maximum 12 points were awarded from one country to another. The winning country is shown in bold.

Spokespersons 

Each country nominated a spokesperson who was responsible for announcing, in English or French, the votes for their respective country. Spokespersons at the 1997 contest are listed below.

 Marios Skordis
 Ömer Önder
 Ragnhild Sælthun Fjørtoft
 
 Eileen Dunne
 
 
 Corry Brokken
 
 Belén Fernández de Henestrosa
 Christina Mänz
 Jan Chojnacki
 Helene Tedre
 Segmedina Srna
 Cristina Rocha
 Gösta Hanson
 Niki Venega
 Anna Bonanno
 
 Arina Sharapova
 
  and Marie Myriam
 
 Colin Berry
 Svanhildur Konráðsdóttir

Broadcasts 

Each participating broadcaster was required to relay the contest live and in full via television. Non-participating EBU member broadcasters were also able to relay the contest as "passive participants"; any passive countries wishing to participate in the following year's event were also required to provide a live broadcast of the contest or a deferred broadcast within 24 hours. Broadcasters were able to send commentators to provide coverage of the contest in their own native language and to relay information about the artists and songs to their viewers.

Known details on the broadcasts in each country, including the specific broadcasting stations and commentators, are shown in the tables below:

Other awards

Barbara Dex Award
The Barbara Dex Award was first organised for artists in this year's contest. The award, created by fansite House of Eurovision, was awarded to the performer deemed to have been the "worst dressed" among the participants. The winner in 1997 was Malta's representative Debbie Scerri, as determined by the founders of the House of Eurovision site Edwin van Thillo and Rob Paardekam.

Legacy

The Eurovision Song Contest has long held a fandom within the LGBT community, however it was not until the 1997 event that an openly LGBT artist was selected to compete in the event. 's Paul Oscar was the first openly gay man to compete as a lead artist in Eurovision. Oscar's participation, as well as changing attitudes to homosexuality in Europe in the following years, marked the beginning of wider visibility of LGBT artists and themes; the  provided the first trans participant in Israel's Dana International,  saw 's  become the first competing artists to perform in drag, and the  contained the first display of same-sex affection on stage through a kiss between the two male members of the Israeli band PingPong. Oscar's contest performance, which featured four female backing dancers dressed in black latex clothing and sexually sugestive choreography, pushed the boundaries for sexual expression on the Eurovision stage for the first time.

The changes in the rules regarding the use of orchestra for this contest would eventually lead to the complete abandonment of live musical accompaniment in the Eurovision Song Contest. Ahead of the  the rules were modified again to make the procurement of an orchestra an optional component to staging the event, with that year's event becoming the first to have all competing entries performed to pre-recorded backing tracks. The rules of the contest have since been modified further, and no live musical accompaniment is now allowed for any competing entries. The abolishment of the orchestra proved controversial among some circles, with three-time, former Eurovision winner Johnny Logan referring to the modified event as "karaoke" in 2000.

The introduction of televoting to the contest followed several years of successive Irish wins, with the national juries typically voting for more traditional, middle-of-the-road songs than those that represented the wider tastes of the general public, as was the case in 1996 when Eimear Quinn's "The Voice" was victorious over more modern entries such as Gina G's "Ooh Aah... Just a Little Bit", which represented the United Kingdom at that year's event and would go on to receive a nomination for Best Dance Recording at the 1998 Grammy Awards. The successful trial of televoting in five countries led to widespread adoption for all countries in 1998, and public voting continues to play a part in determining the result of the contest to the present day. The widespread use of televoting in the following years would however lead to accusations of greater political bias and "bloc voting", with the perception that neighbouring countries swap points and large diasporas are able to vote en masse for their native countries, skewing the results in their favour.

Notes

References

Bibliography

External links

 

 
1997
1997 in music
1997 in Irish music
May 1997 events in Europe
1997 in Ireland
1990s in Dublin (city)
1997 in Irish television
Events in Dublin (city)
Music in Dublin (city)
Music festivals in Ireland